Prostratus is a genus of fungi within the Melanconidaceae family. This is a monotypic genus, containing the single species Prostratus cyclobalanopsidis.

References

External links
Prostratus at Index Fungorum

Melanconidaceae
Monotypic Sordariomycetes genera